Ivana Christová (born August 10, 1970) is a Slovak singer, businesswoman and former beauty queen. She was crowned as Miss Czechoslovakia 1989 and was first modern Miss in Czechoslovakia history. She also won international beauty contest Miss Maja International 1989.

Television
Christová was part of few reality shows in Slovakia. She was in cast for reality show Celebrity Camp. Christová was voted out in day 15 and finished in 13th Place.

Tanec snov
In 2015 she was part of dancing competition Tanec snov where she was paired with dancer Radoslav Kováčik.

References

External links 
  in the Czech and Slovak film database

1970 births
Slovak female models
20th-century Slovak women singers
Living people
People from Prešov
21st-century Slovak women singers